Bungu may refer to:

Languages 
 Bungu language, a Bantu language spoken by the Bungu people in Tanzania
 Bongo language, a Nilo-Saharan language spoken in South Sudan

People 
 Vuyani Bungu (born 1967), a South African boxer
 Bungu Nkwenkwe, husband of Xhosa prophetess Nontetha Nkwenkwe

Places 
 Bungu County, a county of Jubek State in Sudan
 Bungu, a village in Bogoro, Bauchi State, Nigeria
 Bungu, a ward in Korogwe District, Tanzania
 Bungu, a village in Rufiji District, Tanzania
 Bungu Owiny, ruins of the Jo k'Owiny Luo peoples near Lake Kanyaboli, Kenya
 Vungu, a historic kingdom on the Congo River, also spelled Bungu

Other uses 
 Bungu people, of Tanzania
 Poso bungu, a species of fish
 Ceratotheca sesamoides or false sesame, known as bungu in Nigeria
 Hagoromo Bungu, a Japanese office supply company

See also 
 Bungus (disambiguation)